Thymaina is a small Greek island in the Ikaria regional unit, in the eastern Aegean Sea. Thymaina is located just west of Fournoi Korseon and is administratively a part of its municipality. Its name is said to be derived from the thyme that grows throughout the island. Thymaina has two settlements, Thymaina settlement and Keramidou. Thymaina is a protected area along with all Fournoi cluster and belongs to the network Natura 2000.

Historical population

References

Islands of Greece
Landforms of Ikaria (regional unit)
Islands of the North Aegean
Fournoi Korseon